The Oklahoma Department of Securities (ODS) is an agency of the state of Oklahoma. The department oversees the securities business in Oklahoma. The department regulates securities agents, broker-dealers, and investment advisers as well as the registration of stocks, bonds, and many other types of securities.

The department is led by the Oklahoma Securities Commission, which consists of five members. Four members are appointed by the Governor of Oklahoma with the consent of the Oklahoma Senate to serve six-year terms. The State Banking Commissioner serve as the fifth voting member of the commission. The department's executive is the Administrator of Securities who is appointed by the commission.

The department was created in 1959 during the term of Governor J. Howard Edmondson.

Organization
Securities Commission
Administrator
Deputy Administrator
Professional Registrations and Compliance Division
Corporate Finance Division
Investigations and Enforcement Division
Investor Education Division

Securities Commission
The Securities Commission is the governing body of the Department of Securities. The commission is composed of five members appointed by the Governor of Oklahoma with the advice and consent of the Oklahoma Senate. One member is a member of the Oklahoma Bar Association, one member is an active officer of a bank or trust company operating in the State, one member is a certified public accountant and one member is an active member from the securities industry. The State Banking Commissioner serves as the fifth voting member of the commission.

All members of the commission, except the State Banking Commissioner, serve six-year terms.

It is the duty of the commission to establish rules regulating the securities market and to appoint an Administrator of the department, who serves at the pleasure of the commission.

Budget
The Department of Securities is not funded by yearly appropriations from the Oklahoma Legislature. Instead, it is funded entirely from license fees generated from the entities regulated by the department.

See also
Oklahoma Office of State Finance
Oklahoma State Banking Department
Oklahoma Tax Commission

References

External links
Oklahoma Department of Securities website

Securities, Department of
1959 establishments in Oklahoma